Anja Lauvdal (born 1987 in Flekkefjord, Norway) is a Norwegian jazz musician (piano and keyboards) and composer.

Career 
Lauvdal studied music on the Jazz program at Trondheim Musikkonsevatorium, NTNU, where she joined the acoustic jazz band "Moskus" together with fellow students, Fredrik Luhr Dietrichson (double bass) from Haugesund and Hans Hulbækmo (drums) from Tolga, at NTNU. Their debut album was Salmesykkel (2012) Lauvdal also played in "Your Headlights Are On" with a self-titled debut album Your Headlights Are On (2011) and "Avalanche" debuting with the album Whiteout (2012), with Hans Hulbækmo. "Skadedyr" is another project initiated at NTNU together with Heida Mobeck, performing at Victoria, in 2012.

Lauvdal played with the band "Ósk" at "Parkteateret" in 2013, a project that builds on the narrative traditions of old traditional and folk music, and with clear singer/songwriter notations it moves between jazz and pop to convey emotion or strong opinions. Oskar Yazan Mellemsether joined with additional musicians Vegard Edvardsen, Heida Mobeck, Siv Øyunn Kjenstad and Thorstein Lavik Larsen in 2010 to form the band "Ósk". In 2011 gave many gigs and concerts, including on "By:Larm" 2011, "Pstereofestivalen", "Nattrock" and "Storåsfestivalen".

In 2015 she released the album "Yoga" with the band Broen.

Honors 
2011: Grappas Debutantpris, within Moskus
2011: Statkraft's Young Star Grant
2015: Recipient of the Sparebank 1 JazZstipendiat, within the duo Skrap together with Heida Mobeck

Discography 

 Broen
 2013: Broen/Invader Ace: The split jump drug EP (10" EP) (Kakao Musikk)
 2015: Yoga''' (LP) (Nabovarsel)
 2017: I <3 Art (Su Tissue)

 Within Your Headlights Are On
 2011: Your Headlights Are On (Dayladore Collective)

 Within Moskus
 2012: Salmesykkel (Hubro)
 2014: Mestertyven (Hubro)
 2016: Ulv Ulv (Hubro)
 2018: Mirakler (Hubro)

 Within Snøskred (Avalanche)
 2012: Whiteout (Riot Factory)

 Within Skadedyr
 2013: Kongekrabbe (Hubro)
 2016: Culturen (Hubro)
 2018: Musikk!'' (Hubro)

References

External links
Moskustrio official Website

21st-century Norwegian pianists
Norwegian jazz pianists
Norwegian jazz composers
Women jazz pianists
Norwegian University of Science and Technology alumni
1987 births
Living people
Musicians from Flekkefjord
21st-century women pianists